Beshentsevo is a rural locality (a selo) in Logovskoy Selsoviet, Pervomaysky District, Altai Krai, Russia. The population was 167 as of 2013. There are 3 streets.

Geography 
Beshentsevo is located 33 km northeast of Novoaltaysk (the district's administrative centre) by road. Logovskoye is the nearest rural locality.

References 

Rural localities in Pervomaysky District, Altai Krai